John Beardman (born December 5, 1937 in Youngstown, Ohio is a contemporary American artist. He is an abstract expressionist and a major contributor to “art as process” and "action painting" influenced by Willem de Kooning. His work has been the subject of several exhibitions in New York City, Louisville, Kentucky, Birmingham, Michigan and Nova Scotia, Canada. Beardman has received numerous creative artist's grants and fellowships. He currently lives and works in Pennsylvania and has a Studio in Manhattan, New York City.

Life and work

John Beardman was born in Youngstown, Ohio December 5, 1937.

At the age of twelve he moved with his family to a farm outside of Warren, Ohio and started painting at the age of nineteen. He was first intrigued with gesture painting and was later influenced by Dutch-American abstract expressionist Willem de Kooning.

Beardman studied at Case Western Reserve University, Oberlin College and Southern Illinois University. In the 60s he also studied with Stanley William Hayter at his Atelier 17 in Paris and at the College of Sorbonne in Paris and received a certificate.

He earned his living as art professor at the University of Connecticut, Cranbrook Educational Community, Academy of Art and Oakland University from 1961 to 1990.

From 1992 to 2016 Beardman did most of his art work in his “Studio in the Woods” in Cape Breton Island, Nova Scotia, Canada. He also made an open-air exhibition in 2008 "A Song of the Woods" at his Canadian studio.

Beardman has exhibited at various galleries, including one person exhibitions in New York City at Carter Burden Gallery, Noho M55 Gallery, Denise Bibro Fine Art, Inc., Allan Stone Gallery, OK Harris Works of Art, Jayne H. Baum and 55 Mercer Galleries. In Louisville, Kentucky he has exhibited at the Brownstown Gallery and in Birmingham, Michigan at Art Space.

He has works in both public and private collections including NBC, HDH Corp, Best Products, Harry Bober, Allan Stone, Leonard Goldenson, Cornel West, Cranbrook Educational Community, Academy of Art, Detroit Institute of Arts, Hudson River Museum and Carter Burden Center.

Testimonials have come from critics Donald Kuspit, April Kingsley and Karen Chambers and from art historians Meyer Schapiro, and Albert Elsen.

References

Further reading 

 Ann LANDI in March 1999 Art News
 Grace Glueck, The New York Times, Feb 26, 1999, Art in Review
 Karen S. Chambers in Review Magazine, June 15, 1998
 Ken Johnson, The New York, Times, Dec 12, 1997
 Jean Herskowitz, Cover magazine, October 1998
 Michael Brenson, The New York Times,1974
 Rachel Youens, The New York Times, May 10, 1985

External links
 Official Website

1937 births
Living people
Abstract painters
American male painters
American abstract artists
American Expressionist painters
American contemporary painters
Artists from New York City
Modern painters
Case Western Reserve University alumni
Oberlin College alumni
Southern Illinois University alumni
College of Sorbonne alumni
University of Connecticut alumni
Cranbrook Educational Community alumni
Oakland University alumni